Majengo is an administrative ward in Kigoma-Ujiji District of Kigoma Region in Tanzania. 
In 2016 the Tanzania National Bureau of Statistics report there were 4,765 people in the ward, from 4,329 in 2012.

Villages / neighborhoods 
The ward has 4 neighborhoods.
 Bogogwa
 Bonde
 Katonyanga
 Rusimbi

References

Wards of Kigoma Region